In mathematics, nuclear operators are an important class of linear operators introduced by Alexander Grothendieck in his doctoral dissertation. Nuclear operators are intimately tied to the projective tensor product of two topological vector spaces (TVSs).

Preliminaries and notation 

Throughout let X,Y, and Z be topological vector spaces (TVSs) and L : X → Y be a linear operator (no assumption of continuity is made unless otherwise stated).

 If S is a subspace of X then both the quotient map X → X/S and the canonical injection S → X are homomorphisms. 
 The set of continuous linear maps X → Z (resp. continuous bilinear maps ) will be denoted by L(X, Z) (resp. B(X, Y; Z)) where if Z is the underlying scalar field then we may instead write L(X) (resp. B(X, Y)). 
 Any linear map  can be canonically decomposed as follows:  where  defines a bijection called the canonical bijection associated with L. 
 X* or  will denote the continuous dual space of X.
  will denote the algebraic dual space of X (which is the vector space of all linear functionals on X, whether continuous or not). 
 A linear map L : H → H from a Hilbert space into itself is called positive if  for every . In this case, there is a unique positive map r : H → H, called the square-root of L, such that . 
 If  is any continuous linear map between Hilbert spaces, then  is always positive.
 A linear map  is called compact or completely continuous if there is a neighborhood U of the origin in X such that  is precompact in Y.

Notation for topologies 

 As usual, if X* is considered as a topological vector space but it has not been made clear what topology it is endowed with, then the topology will be assumed to be b(X′, X).

A canonical tensor product as a subspace of the dual of Bi(X, Y) 

If we denote the span of the range of 𝜒 by X ⊗ Y then it can be shown that X ⊗ Y together with 𝜒 forms a tensor product of X and Y (where x ⊗ y := 𝜒(x, y)). 
This gives us a canonical tensor product of X and Y.

If Z is any other vector space then the mapping Li(X ⊗ Y; Z) → Bi(X, Y; Z) given by u ↦ u ∘ 𝜒 is an isomorphism of vector spaces. 
In particular, this allows us to identify the algebraic dual of X ⊗ Y with the space of bilinear forms on X × Y. 
Moreover, if X and Y are locally convex topological vector spaces (TVSs) and if X ⊗ Y is given the 𝜋-topology then for every locally convex TVS Z, this map restricts to a vector space isomorphism  from the space of continuous linear mappings onto the space of continuous bilinear mappings. 
In particular, the continuous dual of X ⊗ Y can be canonically identified with the space B(X, Y) of continuous bilinear forms on X × Y; 

Nuclear operators between Banach spaces 

There is a canonical vector space embedding  defined by sending  to the map
 
Thus it has a continuous extension to a map , where it is known that this map is not necessarily injective. Explicitly, if  is a nuclear operator then .

Characterization 
Suppose that X and Y are Banach spaces and that  is a continuous linear operator. 
 The following are equivalent:
  is nuclear.
 If Y is reflexive then  is a nuclear if and only if  is nuclear, in which case .

Properties 
Let X and Y be Banach spaces and let  be a continuous linear operator. 

Nuclear operators between Hilbert spaces 

Nuclear automorphisms of a Hilbert space are called trace class operators.

Let X and Y be Hilbert spaces and let N : X → Y be a continuous linear map. Then N is a nuclear map if and only if R is a nuclear map; 
hence, to study nuclear maps between Hilbert spaces it suffices to restrict one's attention to positive self-adjoint operators.

Characterizations 

Let X and Y be Hilbert spaces and let N : X → Y be a continuous linear map whose absolute value is R : X → X. 
The following are equivalent:
N : X → Y is nuclear.
R : X → X is nuclear.
 is nuclear, in which case . 
N : X → Y is an integral map.

Nuclear operators between locally convex spaces 

Suppose that U is a convex balanced closed neighborhood of the origin in X and B is a convex balanced bounded Banach disk in Y with both X and Y locally convex spaces. Let  and let  be the canonical projection.

Definition: Let X and Y be Hausdorff locally convex spaces.

When X and Y are Banach spaces, then this new definition of nuclear mapping is consistent with the original one given for the special case where X and Y are Banach spaces.

Sufficient conditions for nuclearity 
 If  is a nuclear map between two Hausdorff locally convex spaces, then its transpose  is a continuous nuclear map (when the dual spaces carry their strong dual topologies). 
 If in addition X and Y are Banach spaces, then .
 If  is a nuclear map between two Hausdorff locally convex spaces and if  is a completion of X, then the unique continuous extension  of N is nuclear.

Characterizations 
Let X and Y be Hausdorff locally convex spaces and let  be a continuous linear operator. 
 The following are equivalent:
  is nuclear.

Properties 
The following is a type of Hahn-Banach theorem for extending nuclear maps:
Furthermore, when X and Y are Banach spaces and E is an isometry then for any ,  can be picked so that . 
 Suppose that  is a TVS-embedding whose image is closed in Z and let  be the canonical projection. Then for every nuclear map  there exists a nuclear map  such that . 
 Furthermore, when X and Z are Banach spaces and E is an isometry then for any ,  can be picked so that .

Let X and Y be Hausdorff locally convex spaces and let  be a continuous linear operator. 
 Any nuclear map is compact.

See also

References

Bibliography

External links 

 Nuclear space at ncatlab

Topological vector spaces
Tensors
Operator theory
Topological tensor products
Linear operators